Jisk'a Sallalla (Aymara jisk'a little, sallalla a big heap of quinoa, Sallalla a mountain next to Jisk'a Sallalla, "little Sallalla", also spelled Jiskha Sallala) is a   mountain in the Chilla-Kimsa Chata mountain range in the Andes of Bolivia. It is situated in the La Paz Department, Ingavi Province, Jesús de Machaca Municipality. Jisk'a Sallalla lies south-west of the mountains Wisk'achani and Sallalla.

References 

Mountains of La Paz Department (Bolivia)